"Symphony" is a song by British classical crossover band Clean Bandit featuring Swedish singer Zara Larsson. It is the second single from Clean Bandit's second studio album, What Is Love? (2018). The song was released on March 17, 2017, the same day as Larsson's second studio album, So Good, where it was also included as a bonus track. The single peaked at the top of the UK Singles Chart, becoming Larsson's first number one on the chart and Clean Bandit's third. Outside the United Kingdom, the single also topped the chart in Larsson's native Sweden, as well as in neighbouring Norway.

Music video
The song's music video was premiered the same day the song was released, on 17 March 2017. It was directed by Clean Bandit's members Grace Chatto and Jack Patterson and features Larsson in a glittery dress backed by Clean Bandit and an orchestra while an emotional story plays out.

The directors have explained in the "Making of" video and in interviews that the video features a gay couple and "tells the tragic story of a conductor who loses his boyfriend in a bicycle crash. The conductor leads the symphony orchestra that [Clean Bandit and Zara Larsson] are part of." Singer Zara Larsson has spoken about why they wanted to specifically feature a black gay couple in the video and she has said that she finds it ridiculous that people continue to illogically read the couple as being brothers or father and son.

The video begins at dusk near Rotherhithe, accompanied to sound of an orchestra tuning up; meanwhile a young man packs away his Mac and briskly rides away, with no lighting,  on a pedal bike. At the hall, during a hiatus, Zara's gaze lowers as sirens penetrate silence from faraway at the static crash cordon aftermath observed by an aerial view. Subsequent scenes show the man and his partner engaged in various activities, intercalated by scenes of the surviving partner grieving and visiting the spots they used to go together. The surviving partner paints the departed partner's bike white all-over and fixes it somewhere nearby where the fatality happened. He also begins to write music again as we find out he is a composer and his late partner was his inspiration. By the end, he has composed a beautiful symphony in his late partner's memory. The video ends with him looking out into the crowd while his deceased partner looks on proudly. The conductor is played by Michael Akinsulire and his deceased partner / boyfriend is played by Josias Bertrand.

As of March 2023, the video has over 1.2 billion views on YouTube.

Live performances
Clean Bandit and Larsson gave their first live performance of the song on The Voice UK on 18 March 2017.

A performance on The Tonight Show Starring Jimmy Fallon followed on 21 April 2017.

On August 14, 2017, a live performance of the song at the Teen Choice Awards 2017 event was uploaded on the band's YouTube channel.

Notable uses
An edited version of the track was used in the BBC's Christmas 2017 short film and idents celebrating spending Christmas together. They were broadcast on BBC One during December 2017.
 
It was covered by BAFTA-winning actress Suranne Jones, accompanied by a choir from the Youth Theatre group of the Half Moon Theatre, for a 2019 Children in Need charity album titled Got it Covered.

In 2021 the song, performed by Strictly Come Dancings house band, was used in week eight of the show to accompany a dance by Rose Ayling-Ellis and Giovanni Pernice. The performance, which included a period of silence in reference to Ayling-Ellis's deafness, scored 39 points out of a possible 40 and received widespread praise, with judge Anton Du Beke described it as "the greatest thing (he had) seen on the show". They performed the routine again in the final, scoring a perfect 40 points and winning the competition. Their performance earned the dancers Heat magazine's 2021 Unmissables Award for TV Moment of the Year and the 2022 BAFTA TV Award for Must-See Moment.

Track listingDigital download"Symphony" (featuring Zara Larsson) – 3:32Digital download – acoustic version"Symphony" (featuring Zara Larsson) (acoustic version) – 3:36Digital download – alternative version"Symphony" (featuring Zara Larsson) (alternative version) – 3:32Digital download – MK remix"Symphony" (featuring Zara Larsson) (MK remix) – 4:55Digital download – R3hab remix"Symphony" (featuring Zara Larsson) (R3hab remix) – 2:39Digital download – Cash Cash remix"Symphony" (featuring Zara Larsson) (Cash Cash remix) – 4:13Digital download – Sem Thomasson remix"Symphony" (featuring Zara Larsson) (Sem Thomasson remix) – 5:14Digital download – Lodato & Joseph Duveen remix"Symphony" (featuring Zara Larsson) (Lodato & Joseph Duveen remix) – 3:36Digital download – James Hype remix"Symphony" (featuring Zara Larsson) (James Hype remix) – 3:24Digital download – Dash Berlin remix"Symphony" (featuring Zara Larsson) (Dash Berlin remix) – 3:04Digital download – Coldabank remix'
"Symphony" (featuring Zara Larsson) (Coldabank remix) – 3:59

Charts

Weekly charts

Year-end charts

Decade-end charts

Certifications

Release history

See also
List of number-one dance singles of 2017 (Australia)
List of number-one dance singles of 2017 (U.S.)

References

2017 singles
2017 songs
Clean Bandit songs
Zara Larsson songs
Atlantic Records singles
Epic Records singles
Songs written by Ina Wroldsen
Songs written by Steve Mac
Songs written by Ammar Malik
Number-one singles in Norway
Number-one singles in Poland
Number-one singles in Scotland
Number-one singles in Sweden
UK Singles Chart number-one singles
Songs written by Jack Patterson (Clean Bandit)
LGBT-related songs
Song recordings produced by Mark Ralph (record producer)